The following outline is provided as an overview of and topical guide to land transport:

Land transport – transport or movement of people, animals, and goods from one location to another on land, usually by railway or road, but also off-road.

What type of thing is land transport? 

Land transport can be described as all of the following:

 Technology – all forms of land transport, except walking and running, are types of technology.
 Transport – movement of humans, animals and goods from one location to another.

Types of land transport 

Types of land transport
 Human-powered transport
 Walking
 Running
 Cycling
 Skateboarding
 Human-powered aircraft
 Animal-powered transport
 Off-road transport
 Road transport
 Rail transport
 Other
 Pipeline transport
 Cable transport

Functions of land transport 

 Travel
 Public transport
 Freight transport

History of land transport 

History of land transport
 History of human-powered transport
 History of cycling
 History of running
 History of skateboarding
 History of human-powered aircraft
 History of animal-powered transport
 History of road transport
 History of trucking
 History of the trucking industry in the United States
 History of rail transport
 Other
 History of pipeline transport
 History of cable transport

Elements of land transport

Land transport infrastructure 

 Rail transport infrastructure
 Railroad tracks
 Railway electrification system
 Railway signaling
 Bridges
 Tunnels
 Train stations
 Road transport
 Cycling infrastructure
 Roads
 Bridges
 Tunnels
 Street lights
 Traffic lights
 Traffic signs
 Other
 Pipeline

Land transport operations 

 Rail transport operations
 Public transport timetable
 Road transport operations
 Driving
 Driver licensing
 Motor vehicle registration
 Vehicle registration certificate
 Vehicle licence
 Vehicle registration plate
 Road traffic safety
 Highway patrol
 Trucking
 Truck driver
 Transportation planning
 Road construction
 Road maintenance
 Roadworks

Land transport vehicles 

 Rail vehicles – hook them together, and they make a train.
 Locomotive
 Railroad car
 Off-road vehicle
 Road vehicle
 Bicycle
 Car
 Truck

Land transport publications 

 Journal of Transport and Land Use

Persons influential in land transport 

 Amzi L. Barber
 Henry Ford
 Cornelius Vanderbilt

See also 

 Outline of transport

References

External links 

Land transport
Land transport